The Großer Landgraben is a river of Mecklenburg-Vorpommern, Germany. It is formed at the confluence of Landgraben (west-flowing branch), Kleiner Landgraben (north-flowing branch) and Mittelgraben near Siedenbollentin. It flows into the Tollense in Klempenow.

See also
List of rivers of Mecklenburg-Vorpommern

Rivers of Mecklenburg-Western Pomerania
Rivers of Germany